Patrick Lee Tilley (born February 15, 1953) is an American former professional football player who was a wide receiver in the National Football League (NFL) for the St. Louis Cardinals (1976–1986). He was selected to the Pro Bowl after the 1980 season.

Tilley played football and graduated in 1971 from Fair Park High School in Shreveport. Thereafter, he enrolled at Louisiana Tech University in Ruston, where he played for the Bulldogs.

Tilley led the St. Louis Cardinals in receiving from 1978-1982 and started every game but one from 1978-1985. His best season was in 1981 when he caught 66 passes for 1040 yards and three TDs. 

After his football career ended with the 1986 season with the St. Louis Cardinals, Tilley became the area director for the Fellowship of Christian Athletes and gave motivational messages throughout northwest Louisiana. In his Christian testimony, Tilley said, "When I put God first in my life, my football career boomed." Tilley also coached the Bossier City Battle Wings of af2.

References

1953 births
Living people
Fair Park High School alumni
American football wide receivers
Louisiana Tech Bulldogs football players
St. Louis Cardinals (football) players
National Conference Pro Bowl players
Leaders of the Fellowship of Christian Athletes
Players of American football from Shreveport, Louisiana
Bossier–Shreveport Battle Wings coaches
Ed Block Courage Award recipients